Henicops is a genus of centipedes in the family Henicopidae. It was described by British entomologist George Newport in 1845.

Species
There are eight valid species:

 Henicops armenicus Muralewicz, 1926
 Henicops brevilabiatus (Ribaut, 1923)
 Henicops dentatus Pocock, 1901
 Henicops howensis Edgecombe, 2004
 Henicops maculatus Newport, 1845
 Henicops milledgei Hollington & Edgecombe, 2004
 Henicops tropicanus Hollington & Edgecombe, 2004
 Henicops washpoolensis Edgecombe & Hollington, 2005

References

 

 
 
Centipede genera
Animals described in 1845
Taxa named by George Newport